Shaupeneak Ridge Cooperative Recreation Area is a  recreational and protected area in the U.S. state of New York. It is located in the town of Esopus in eastern Ulster County.

Shaupeneak Ridge CRA is owned by the Scenic Hudson Land Trust, a private entity seeking to preserve lands of historic, ecological, and aesthetic significance in the Hudson Valley.  However, the property is dually administered by Scenic Hudson and the New York State Department of Environmental Conservation due to an agreement made possible by the New York Fish & Wildlife Management Act (FWMA).  By New York State standards, Shaupeneak Ridge CRA is managed similar to a multiple use area, although with somewhat more restrictive use rules.  Outdoor activities offered include hiking, fishing, hunting, and cross country skiing.

Trails in Shaupeneak Ridge CRA are well blazed, leading across numerous environs from the meadows at the base of the mountain to rocky overlooks along the ridgeline.  Parts of the property lie within what is known as the Shaupeneak Ridge Biologically Important Area, an area recognized by the state of New York for its biodiversity.  The lower sections of the Shaupeneak Ridge CRA lie just west of the Esopus/Lloyd Scenic Area of Statewide Significance, with the higher sections having a view across the Scenic Area towards the Hudson River and beyond.  

Access to Shaupeneak Ridge Cooperative Recreation Area is possible from a parking lot at the base of Shaupeneak Mountain off of Old Post Road (Ulster County Route 16).  An additional parking area is located at the top of the mountain, along Popletown Road.

See also

Nearby recreational/historical areas in the Marlboro Mountains:
John Burroughs Nature Sanctuary at Slabsides
Hudson Valley Rail Trail
Hemlock Ridge Multiple Use Area

References

Marlboro Mountains
Protected areas of Ulster County, New York